Tauquir Ahmed (born 5 March 1966) is a Bangladeshi architect and actor, turned director in both television and cinema. His films won many international and national awards including Bangladesh National Film Awards in the Best Director, Best Screenplay and Best Story categories for the films Joyjatra (2004) and Oggatonama (2016).

Education
Ahmed studied in Jhenidah Cadet College (JCC) for his SSC and HSC exam. In JCC he actively took part in inter-house drama competition. He then studied architecture in Bangladesh University of Engineering and Technology (BUET). He completed film diploma from New York Film Academy in 2002. He had training in theatre direction from Royal Court Theatre, London (British Council Scholarship, 1995) and acting (Stage) from ITI training, University of Theatre of Nations, 1989.

Career
Ahmed started his career as a lead-actor in romantic role in early 1980s. Many of his dramas broadcast on BTV at that time. Ahmed came out as a film director by making Joyjatra, Rupkothar Golpo, and Daruchini Dip.

Personal life 
Ahmed married actress Bipasha Hayat on 23 July 1999. Together they have one son - Arib and one daughter - Arisha. He is the son-in-law of Abul Hayat.

Controversy 
Toukir and Bipasha Hayat have been sued by his sister Tanjin Haider for embezzling Tk 1.5 million in the name of build and run the 'Nakkhtrabari Resort and Convention Centre' on 25 bigha land at Rajendrapur, Gazipur.

Works

Dramas and telefilms

As director

Filmography

As director

Publication
 Protisoron (stage play, 2012)
 Icchamrittu (stage play, 2013)
 Oggyatonama (stage play 2015)

Other projects
 Nakkhatrabari Resort

Awards and recognitions
Bangladesh National Film Awards
 Best Screenplay, Best Director and Best Producer (Joyjatra, 2004).
 Best Film, Best Actor in a Negative Role and Best Story Award, (Oggatonama, 2016)
Meril Prothom Alo Awards
 Best Film Director, (Joyjatra, 2004)
 Best Film Director, (Rupkothar Golpo, 2006)

Dhaka International Film Festival
 Special Award for the Film, Joyjatra (2004)
 Audience Choice Award, Film: Rupkothar Golpo (2006)
 Special Mention, Film: Oggatonama (2017)
 Best Director, FIPRESCI Award: Bangladesh Panorama Section, Film: Haldaa (2018)

Asia-Pacific Film Festival
 Best Film Award, Film: Oggatonama (2017)
Cutting Edge International Film Festival, Florida, USA
 Best Narrative Feature Award, Film: Oggatonama (2016)
Film Fest Kosovo
 Best director and Best screenplay Award, Film: Oggatonama(The Unnamed)
SAARC Film Festival, Sri Lanka
 Best Feature Film, Best Original Score, Best Editor and Best Cinematographer Award, Film: Haldaa (2018)
 Best Screenplay Award, Film: Oggatonama (2017)
Bali Film Festival, Indonesia
 Audience Choice Award, Film: Daruchini Dwip
Gulf of Naples Independent Film Festival, Italy
 Jury Mention Award, Film: Oggatonama (2016)
Kashmir World Film Festival, India
 Best Feature Film Award, Film: Haldaa (2018)
Religion Today Film Festival, Italy
 Special Mention Award, Film: Oggatonama (2016)
 Grand Prix, Film: Haldaa (2018)
Washington DC South Asian Film Festival, USA
 Best Director, Film: Oggatonama (2016)

References

External links
 
 
 

Living people
1966 births
Bangladeshi male film actors
Bangladeshi male television actors
Best Director National Film Award (Bangladesh) winners
Bangladesh University of Engineering and Technology alumni
Place of birth missing (living people)
Best Film Directing Meril-Prothom Alo Critics Choice Award winners
Best Screenplay National Film Award (Bangladesh) winners
Best Story National Film Award (Bangladesh) winners